Futlyar (Fizik-2) is a Russian deep-water homing torpedo tested by the Russian Navy in 2017; it entered service in the same year. Developed by the Saint Petersburg Research Institute of Marine Engineering and produced by the Dagdizel Machine-Building Factory, it will replace the UGST (Fizik-1.) It will first equip the new Borey and Yasen classes of nuclear submarines.

See also
Mark 48
DM2A4
Black Shark
Yu-6

References

Torpedoes of Russia
Dagdizel Plant products